Jim Mickle (born 1979) is an American director and writer, known for such films as Mulberry Street, Stake Land, We Are What We Are and Cold in July. He also co-developed the SundanceTV series Hap and Leonard, and the Netflix series Sweet Tooth.

Early life 
Jim Mickle was born in Pottstown, Pennsylvania in 1979.  Mickle was inspired to become a director after he saw Army of Darkness.  He attended New York University and graduated in 2002.  He worked as a production assistant and grip on a series of films by first-time directors who had not gone to film school.  The experiences were frustrating for him, and he described the films as vanity projects.  Mickle prefers directing and editing to writing, and he is attracted to the flexibility and intensity of horror films.

Career 
Mickle and Nick Damici met while working on a student thesis film in 2001.  While there, they came up with the idea for a zombie film.  This concept eventually morphed into their first collaboration, Mulberry Street, a horror film about gentrification in New York City.  Mickle's second film, Stake Land, was a New York Times Critics' Pick. His 2013 film We Are What We Are was screened at the 2013 Sundance Film Festival and in the Directors' Fortnight section at the 2013 Cannes Film Festival.  He directed the film adaptation of Joe R. Lansdale's novel Cold in July, in which Michael C. Hall starred, and has worked on Esperanza, the story of a fatal wildfire in southern California, adapted by Sean O'Keefe from a book by John N. Maclean. In 2016 Mickle & Damici developed the TV series Hap and Leonard, based on Joe R. Lansdale's novels, with Mickle directing multiple episodes during the series' three seasons.

Awards

Filmography

As director

References

External links 
 

1979 births
Living people
21st-century American male writers
21st-century American screenwriters
American male screenwriters
American male television writers
American television directors
American television writers
Film directors from Pennsylvania
Horror film directors
People from Pottstown, Pennsylvania
Screenwriters from Pennsylvania